The 1923 Loyola University Chicago football team was an American football team that represented Loyola University Chicago as an independent during the 1923 college football season. Led by Roger Kiley in his first season as head coach, the Loyola compiled an overall record of 6–3. In January 1923, Kiley was hired from Notre Dame to serve as head coach for Loyola.

Schedule

References

Loyola
Loyola Ramblers football seasons
Loyola University Chicago football